Daniel Oss (born 13 January 1987) is an Italian professional road bicycle racer, who currently rides for UCI ProTeam .

Career
Oss was born in Trento. In 2004, Oss' first results on the track and road were outstanding: he excelled in the National Student Track Championships in Pordenone, collecting three podiums in the pursuit; in the same year gained third place in the Madison at the European Student Championships in Fiorenzuola d'Arda.

After a year in the dark, Oss returned to the limelight in 2006 succeeding to finish in five races including Ponton, Isolates Vicentina, Cremona Pessina and Bibano of Godega. In 2007, he won two smaller competitions while in 2008, besides three other competitions, he also participated in the World Championships in Varese, coming home in eighth place in the Under 23 time-trial.

In 2009, Oss turned professional, joining the team ; he entered the top 10 for the first time in a professional race during the Tour of Catalunya, it was in the prologue, in which he finished ninth place, four seconds detached from the winner Thor Hushovd. During the same year, he participated in the National Track Championships and came first in the Pursuit along with companions Jacopo Guarnieri, Elia Viviani and Davide Cimolai. Towards the end of the season, he was able to finish in the top five of a number of professional races: two fourth places in the Tour of Missouri and fifth in the Gran Premio Industria e Commercio di Prato.

In 2010, Oss came fifth in the Gent-Wevelgem and fourth in one of the stages of Three Days of De Panne. He was also involved in his first ever Grand Tour when he came 124th in the Tour de France, he also won the combativity award on Stage 18, for his involvement in the breakaway. He played a key role as a lead out man for sprinter and teammate Elia Viviani in the inaugural USA Pro Cycling Challenge. It was Oss's leadouts that secured Viviani two stage victories and the Green, Points Championship. On Stage 6 into Denver, Viviani rewarded Oss' hardwork by allowing him to win the sprint finish.

Major results

2004
 1st  Individual pursuit, National Junior Track Championships
 2nd Time trial, National Junior Road Championships
2007
 1st Bibano di Godega S. Urbano
2008
 2nd Gran Premio di Poggiana
 2nd GP Industria del Cuoio e delle Pelli
 3rd Time trial, National Under-23 Road Championships
 6th Trofeo Alcide Degasperi
 8th Road race, UCI Under-23 Road World Championships
 8th Trofeo Zsšdi
 8th Giro del Belvedere
 10th Trofeo Franco Balestra
2009
 5th Gran Premio Industria e Commercio di Prato
2010
 1st Giro del Veneto
 5th Gent–Wevelgem
 6th Overall Giro della Provincia di Reggio Calabria
1st  Yong rider classification
 10th Overall Tour of Oman
2011
 1st Stage 6 USA Pro Cycling Challenge
 3rd Overall Giro della Provincia di Reggio Calabria
1st  Young rider classification
 6th Coppa Ugo Agostoni
2012
 3rd Gran Premio Industria e Commercio Artigianato Carnaghese
 9th Milan–San Remo
2013
 3rd E3 Harelbeke
 4th Overall Tour de Wallonie
2014
 1st  Team time trial, UCI Road World Championships
 1st Stage 1 (TTT) Giro del Trentino
 2015
 1st  Team time trial, UCI Road World Championships
 1st Stage 9 (TTT) Tour de France
 1st Stage 3 (TTT) Critérium du Dauphiné
 1st  Mountains classification, Tour of California
 8th Gent–Wevelgem
 10th E3 Harelbeke
 2016
 1st Stage 1 (TTT) Tirreno-Adriatico
 1st Stage 5 (TTT) Eneco Tour
 2nd  Team time trial, UCI Road World Championships
 10th E3 Harelbeke
2017
 Vuelta a España
1st Stage 1 (TTT)
Held  after Stages 1–2
 1st Stage 1 (TTT) Tirreno–Adriatico
 1st  Mountains classification, Tour of Guangxi
 2nd  Team time trial, UCI Road World Championships
2018
 5th Road race, National Road Championships
2020
  Combativity award Stage 7 Tour de France
2022
 2nd  UCI World Gravel Championships
 6th Overall Saudi Tour

Grand Tour general classification results timeline

References

External links

 

1987 births
Living people
Sportspeople from Trento
Italian male cyclists
UCI Road World Champions (elite men)
Cyclists from Trentino-Alto Adige/Südtirol